Wack Wack Twin Towers are twin residential towers situated in Mandaluyong, Metro Manila, Philippines.

The towers are set in a country park, developed on former grassland. The area is named after the local bird "uwak" (crow).

References

See also
List of tallest buildings in Metro Manila

Residential skyscrapers in Metro Manila
Twin towers
Residential buildings completed in 1994
1994 establishments in the Philippines
20th-century architecture in the Philippines